Skynyrd Frynds is a tribute album to the American Southern rock band Lynyrd Skynyrd, released in 1994 on MCA Records. It features cover versions of ten Lynyrd Skynyrd songs, as performed by various country music artists. The album reached #8 on Top Country Albums upon its release. The album was executive produced by Gary Rossington.

Content
The album was executive-produced by Lynyrd Skynyrd member Gary Rossington. Alabama's rendition of "Sweet Home Alabama" includes a rewritten verse, which omits the references to Watergate and George Wallace. Wynonna's rendition of "Free Bird" was later included on her 1996 album Revelations, and Sammy Kershaw's "I Know a Little" was later included on his 2000 album Covers the Hits. Confederate Railroad's version of "Simple Man" also appeared on the band's 1998 album Keep On Rockin'. "Tuesday's Gone" by Hank Williams Jr. was originally included on his 1988 album Wild Streak.

Critical reception
Giving it three stars out of five, Allmusic reviewer William Ruhlmann said, "For the most part, those performers display a knowledge of Lynyrd Skynyrd's work and an affection for it." He cited Travis Tritt's, Sammy Kershaw's and Steve Earle's performance as the strongest on the album, but called Alabama's "Sweet Home Alabama" cover "gimmicky" and said of Wynonna's "Free Bird" that she "ends up undercutting its power." Washington City Paper critic Dave McKenna gave a mostly favorable review, saying "the country stars on Frynds don't hide their reverence and affection for the material or its creators," but criticizing the album for not showing the band's "lighter side."

Track listing

Chart performance

Albums

Singles

References

Country albums by American artists
Lynyrd Skynyrd tribute albums
MCA Records compilation albums
Country music compilation albums
1994 compilation albums
Country rock compilation albums
Southern rock compilation albums